Nicolás Marcelo Rodríguez Saá (born 10 May 1984) is an Argentine politician who served as a National Deputy from 2019 to 2021. He is a member of the Justicialist Party.

Early life and education
Nicolás Marcelo Rodríguez Saá was born on 10 May 1984 in San Luis, into the prominent Rodríguez Saá political family. His first cousins are former governors of San Luis Province, Adolfo Rodríguez Saá and Alberto Rodríguez Saá. He studied law at the University of Buenos Aires.

Rodríguez Saá is in a relationship with Justicialist Party politician and deputy for Entre Ríos, Carolina Gaillard, with whom he has a son, Felipe, born in 2020.

Political career
Rodríguez Saá began his career as a legal advisor at the Ministry of Foreign Affairs and Worship in 2014. He would later be an advisor to Governor Alberto Rodríguez Saá, in 2017. That year, he was appointed director of the Casa de San Luis, the "cultural embassy" of San Luis Province in Buenos Aires. From 2018 to 2019, Rodríguez Saá was director of legal affairs at the municipality of José C. Paz Partido, in the administration of intendente Mario Alberto Ishii.

Rodríguez Saá ran for a seat in the Argentine Chamber of Deputies in the 2017 legislative election, as the 16th candidate in the Unidad Ciudadana list. The list received 36.28% of the votes, not enough for Rodríguez Saá to be elected. On 19 December 2019, he took office in place of Laura Alonso, who resigned to become Secretary of Social Inclusivity. He formed part of the Frente de Todos parliamentary bloc.
 
As deputy, Rodríguez Saá formed part of the parliamentary commissions on Political Trials, National Defense, Justice, Criminal Legislation, Foreign Affairs, and Internal Security. He was a supporter of the legalization of abortion in Argentina, and voted in favor of the 2020 Voluntary Interruption of Pregnancy bill, which passed the Chamber.

Ahead of the 2021 primary election, Rodríguez Saá was confirmed as one of the alternate candidates in the Frente de Todos list in Buenos Aires Province.

References

External links

Profile on the official website of the Chamber of Deputies (in Spanish)

Living people
1984 births
21st-century Argentine lawyers
People from San Luis, Argentina
Members of the Argentine Chamber of Deputies elected in Buenos Aires Province
University of Buenos Aires alumni
21st-century Argentine politicians